The Lucknow Junction–Chandigarh Express is an Express train belonging to North Eastern Railway zone that runs between  and  in India. It is currently being operated with 15011/15012 train numbers on a daily basis.

Service

The 15011/Lucknow Jn.–Chandigarh Express has an average speed of 44 km/hr and covers 702 km in 15h 50m. The 15012/Chandigarh–Lucknow Jn. Express has an average speed of 44 km/hr and covers 702 km in 15h 50m.

Route and halts 

The important halts of the train are:

Coach composition

The train has standard ICF rakes with max speed of 110 kmph. The train consists of 12 coaches:

 1 AC II Tier
 1 AC III Tier
 2 Sleeper coaches
 6 General Unreserved
 2 Seating cum Luggage Rake

Traction

Both trains are hauled by a Gonda Loco Shed-based WDM-3A diesel locomotive from Lucknow to Chandigarh and vice versa.

Direction reversal

The train reverses its direction 1 times:

See also 

 Lucknow Junction railway station
 Chandigarh Junction railway station
 Lucknow–Chandigarh Express

Notes

References

External links 

 15011/Lucknow Jn.–Chandigarh Express India Rail Info
 15012/Chandigarh–Lucknow Jn. Express India Rail Info

Passenger trains originating from Lucknow
Express trains in India
Rail transport in Uttarakhand
Rail transport in Haryana
Rail transport in Chandigarh